Matheny is a census-designated place (CDP) in Tulare County, California. The 2010 United States census reported Matheny's population was 1,212.

Matheny's water system, Pratt Mutual, has elevated arsenic levels. Matheny residents are attempting to merge Pratt Mutual into Tulare's water utility. On April 1, 2016, the State Water Resource Control Board issued a mandatory water system consolidation order directing the City of Tulare to connect Matheny Tract to the Tulare County water system.

Geography
According to the United States Census Bureau, the CDP covers an area of 0.4 square miles (1.1 km2), all of it land.

Demographics
The 2010 United States Census reported that Matheny had a population of 1,212. The racial makeup of Matheny was 651 (53.7%) White, 44 (3.6%) African American, 24 (2.0%) Native American, 4 (0.3%) Asian, 0 (0.0%) Pacific Islander, 436 (36.0%) from other races, and 53 (4.4%) from two or more races. Hispanic or Latino of any race were 890 persons (73.4%).

The Census reported that 1,212 people (100% of the population) lived in households, 0 (0%) lived in non-institutionalized group quarters, and 0 (0%) were institutionalized.

There were 320 households, out of which 188 (58.8%) had children under the age of 18 living in them, 164 (51.3%) were opposite-sex married couples living together, 61 (19.1%) had a female householder with no husband present, 41 (12.8%) had a male householder with no wife present.  There were 22 (6.9%) unmarried opposite-sex partnerships, and 1 (0.3%) same-sex married couples or partnerships. 38 households (11.9%) were made up of individuals, and 17 (5.3%) had someone living alone who was 65 years of age or older. The average household size was 3.79.  There were 266 families (83.1% of all households); the average family size was 4.05.

The population was spread out, with 459 people (37.9%) under the age of 18, 120 people (9.9%) aged 18 to 24, 330 people (27.2%) aged 25 to 44, 204 people (16.8%) aged 45 to 64, and 99 people (8.2%) who were 65 years of age or older.  The median age was 26.9 years. For every 100 females, there were 106.8 males.  For every 100 females age 18 and over, there were 108.6 males.

The homeowner vacancy rate was 0.6%; the rental vacancy rate was 4.5%.  525 people (43.3% of the population) lived in owner-occupied housing units and 687 people (56.7%) lived in rental housing units.

References

Census-designated places in Tulare County, California
Census-designated places in California